Michael Bacon (born 1968) is an American 3D artist/animator/designer/musician who has been working in the video game industry since 1996. He has worked on an array of large scale production game titles as Art Director/Lead Artist or Senior Artist with such companies as THQ, Sony Online Entertainment, Boss Game Studios, n-Space, Jaleco Inc, Volition, Hasbro Toy Company, and Aramat Productions.

Game industry

Michael Bacon is currently Senior Artist at Amazon Game Studios working on their New World MMO game franchise. He previously was Lead Environment Artist at Intrepid Studios working on Ashes of Creation.  Before that, was Senior Artist at Sony Online Entertainment in San Diego, California working on the popular EverQuest 2 MMORPG franchise for the PC. Projects there include the international release of EverQuest II: Sentinel's Fate, EverQuest II: The Complete Collection, EverQuest II: The Shadow Odyssey, EverQuest II: Desert of Flames, EverQuest II: Kingdom of Sky, EverQuest II: Echoes of Faydwer, and EverQuest II: Rise of Kunark.

Bacon also worked with Volition contributing significantly to the Xbox 360 titles Saints Row and the Saints Row 2 sequel from publisher THQ.

Music endeavors
He is also a rock guitar player/producer/musician contributing tracks to the WCW vs. nWo wrestling game franchise, Duke Nukem - Land of the Babes for GT Interactive, and the THQ fighting game "VS". Bacon has independent CD releases which including work with the 80s metal band Havuk, the 2006 release contributing tracks to the Madd Krakker "Saltine Dream" CD currently available at ITunes and other on-line distribution networks.

Bacon is also featured on Karlton Coffin's current CD release "3 Minutes of Fury".

Production releases

Discography

References

External links 
 

1968 births
Living people